The Chunichi Shimbun Hai (Japanese 中日新聞杯) is a Grade 3 horse race for Thoroughbreds aged three and over, run in December over a distance of 2000 metres on turf at Chukyo Racecourse.

It was first run in 1965 and has held Grade 3 status since 1984. The race was usually run over 1800 metres before being moved up to its current distance in 2006. It was run at Kokura Racecourse in 1991, 1993, 1994 and 2011.

Winners since 2000

Earlier winners

 1984 - Ascot Eight
 1985 - Kikuno Pegasus
 1986 - Hakuryo Bell
 1987 - Windstoss
 1988 - Tokino Orient
 1989 - Tosho Arrow
 1990 - Dokan Jo
 1991 - Shori Tenyu
 1992 - Fuiyama Kenzan
 1993 - Arashi
 1994 - Nehai Victory
 1995 - Go Go Z
 1996 - Foundry Shori
 1997 - Foundry Shori
 1998 - Tsurumaru Gaisen
 1999 - Shin Kaiun

See also
 Horse racing in Japan
 List of Japanese flat horse races

References

Turf races in Japan